Shiva Pariyar (Nepali: शिव परियार), is a Nepali singer. His songs include "Kaha Theyau Timi", "Kya Dami Bho" and "Pilayo Sathile". As of 2019, he had released ten studio albums.

Career 
Pariyar was born in Sarlahi District.

Pariyar incorporates a range of genres from classical music to modern pop, and can also play the Eastern Classical Tabala and the Western Classical guitar.

In 2003, he received a gold medal in the "National Contemporary Music Competition", hosted by Radio Nepal. He started musical training from early age and released debut album, Mokshya, in 2005.

Three years after releasing his debut album, Pariyar released back-to-back studio albums called Swayam and Kadambini. In 2009, he released his fourth studio album Kya Daami, followed by the fifth album, Fateko Man, in 2010.

In 2011, Pariyar released his sixth album Pagal. The following year he released two consecutive albums: Kathale Magepachhi and Only for You Mero Sathi. In 2013, he released his ninth studio album "Tadako Sathi", composed by Umesh Subba. His tenth album, Shiva Book was released in 2015.

Albums 
 Drishya (2005)
 Swayam (2008)
 Kadambini (2008)
 Kya Daami (2009)
 Fateko Man (2010)
 Pagal''' (2011)
 Kathale Magepachhi (2012)
 Only You Mero Sathi (2012)
 Tadako Sathi (2013)
 Shiva Book'' (2015)

Awards 
 National Youth Talent Award in Art and Music (2016) – Nepal Government
 Best Male Vocal Performance  Award (2017) - Hits FM Music Award
 National Kantipur Music Award (2018) – Radio Kantipur 96.1
 Best Vocal Pop Hits FM Music Award (2019)- Hits FM
 Aadhunik Singer (Male) -National Music Award

References 

21st-century Nepalese male singers
Year of birth missing (living people)
Living people
People from Sarlahi District
Nepalese pop singers
Nepalese folk singers
Nepalese playback singers
Khas people